The Democratic Union of the Roma of Romania (UDRR) was an ethnic minority political party in Romania representing the Romani community.

History
The UDRR contested the 1990 general elections, and despite receiving only 0.21% of the vote, it won a single seat in the Chamber of Deputies. In the Senate elections it received 0.14% of the vote, failing to win a seat.

Electoral history

References

Defunct political parties in Romania
Political parties of minorities in Romania